In Norse mythology, Körmt and Örmt are two rivers which Thor wades through every day when he goes to judgment by Yggdrasill. The source for this is a strophe in Grímnismál which is also quoted in the Prose Edda.

Rivers in Norse mythology
Thor